A cream soup is a soup prepared using cream, light cream, half and half or milk as a key ingredient. Sometimes the dairy product is added at the end of the cooking process, such as after a cream soup has been puréed.

A cream soup will often have a soup base, prepared with ingredients such as onion, celery, garlic powder, celery salt, butter, bacon drippings, flour, salt, pepper, paprika, milk, light cream, and chicken stock or vegetable stock. Various vegetables or meats are then added to the base. Sometimes, leftover vegetables and meats are used in cream soups.

List of cream soups
A multitude of notable cream soups exist, including, but not limited to the following listed below.

Additional cream soups include cream of cauliflower, cream of fennel, cream of potato, cream of corn, cream of walnut, cream of roasted pumpkin, cream of celery and cream-of-anything soup.

Gallery

See also

 Creamed corn
 List of soups

References

 
Soup-related lists